Rein is a male given name.

People named Rein include:
Rein Aedma (born 1952), Estonian actor
Rein Ahas (1966–2018), Estonian geographer and professor
Rein Ahun (1940–2016), Estonian hammer thrower and track and field coach
Rein Aidma (born 1950), Estonian politician
Rein Aren (1927–1990), Estonian actor
Rein Arjukese (1941–2018), Estonian naturalist, dissident and politician
Rein Aun (1940–1995), Estonian decathlete
Rein Baart (born 1972), Dutch football goalkeeper
Rein Boomsma (1879–1943), Dutch footballer
Rein van Duijnhoven (born 1967), Dutch football goalkeeper
Rein Eliaser (1885–1941), Estonian lawyer and politician
Rein Gilje (born 1959), Norwegian sprint canoeist
Rein Haljand (born 1945), Estonian swimmer and sports pedagogue
Rein Henriksen (1915–1994), Norwegian lawyer and industrialist
Rein Jan Hoekstra (born 1941), Dutch politician
Rein Järvelill (born 1966), Estonian politician
Rein Kask (born 1947), Estonian politician
Rein Kilk (born 1953), Estonian entrepreneur and sports figure
Rein Lang (born 1957), Estonian politician and diplomat
Rein Loik (born 1950), Estonian politician, mountain climber and sports figure
Rein Oja (born 1956), Estonian actor and director
Rein Otsason (1931–2004), Estonian banker
Rein Ottoson (born 1953), Estonian sailing coach
Rein Pill (born 1961), Estonian equestrian
Rein Põder (1943–2018), Estonian writer
Rein Põldme (born 1937), Estonian rower, swimming coach and sports figure
Rein Rannap (born 1953), Estonian composer and pianist
Rein Ratas (born 1938), Estonian politician
Rein Raud (born 1961), Estonian scholar and author
Rein Saluri (born 1939), Estonian writer 
Rein Sokk (born 1959), Estonian sports coach and track and field athlete
Rein Strikwerda (1930–2006), Dutch orthopedic surgeon
Rein Suurkask (born), Estonian politician
Rein Suvi (born 1969), Estonian handball player
Rein Taagepera (born 1933), Estonian-American political scientist and politician
Rein Taaramäe (born 1987), Estonian road bicycle racer
Rein Tölp (born 1941), Estonian middle-distance runner
Rein Valdmaa (born 1960), Estonian runner
Rein de Waal (1904–1985), Dutch field hockey player
Rein Willems (born 1945), Dutch businessman

References

Masculine given names
Dutch masculine given names
Estonian masculine given names